"Mustang Heart" is a song recorded by Canadian country music artist George Fox. Released in 1993 as the second single from his fourth studio album, Mustang Heart, it peaked at number 6 on the RPM Country Tracks chart in May 1993.

Chart performance

Year-end charts

References

1993 songs
1993 singles
George Fox songs
Warner Music Group singles
Songs written by George Fox (singer)
Songs written by Bob Gaudio
Song recordings produced by Bob Gaudio